Kristin Otto (born 7 February 1966) is a German Olympic swimming champion. She is most famous for being the first woman to win six gold medals at a single Olympic Games, doing so at the 1988 Seoul Olympic Games. In long course, she held the world records in the 100 meter and 200 meter freestyle events. Otto was also the first woman to swim the short course 100 meter backstroke in under a minute, doing so at an international short course meet at Indiana University in 1983.

Career
Otto was born in Leipzig, Bezirk Leipzig (present-day Sachsen), East Germany, and began swimming at the age of 11, training in an East German sports academy. At sixteen, she participated in her first world championships, the 1982 World Aquatics Championships, winning the gold medal in the 100 meter backstroke as well as two additional gold medals in the 4×100 m relays with the East German team.

After 1982, Otto changed coaches and began concentrating on other speed strokes. At the following European Championships in 1983, Otto finished second in the 100 meter freestyle, following her fellow East German, Birgit Meineke.

In 1984, Otto set a world record in the 200 meter freestyle. She was expected to win gold medals at the 1984 Los Angeles Olympic Games, but was unable to compete due to the boycott by 14 Eastern Bloc countries, including East Germany. In 1985 she fractured a vertebra, keeping her from  competing for most of the year or to go to the European Championships.

Otto returned to competitive swimming at the 1986 World Championships in Madrid, where she won 4 gold medals (100 m freestyle, 200 m individual medley, 4×100 m medley relay and 4×100 m freestyle relay) and 2 silver medals (50 m freestyle, 100 m butterfly). Her success continued the following year at the 1987 European Championships where she won 5 gold medals.

At the 1988 Seoul Olympic Games she once again was expected to win Olympic gold. She won six gold medals, as well as setting Olympic records in the 50 m freestyle and 100 m butterfly.

Otto retired from swimming in 1989. She currently works as a sports reporter for German television.

She was named the Female World Swimmer of the Year in 1984, 1986 and 1988 by Swimming World. In October 1986, she was awarded a Star of People's Friendship in gold (second class) for her sporting success.

Otto's career was marred by the revelations of widespread performance-enhancing drugs used by East German athletes: former teammate Petra Schneider openly admitted that she had used banned substances. However, Otto stated that she was not aware that she was being doped and she passed all the doping tests during competition, saying: "The medals are the only reminder of how hard I worked. It was not all drugs."

See also
 List of members of the International Swimming Hall of Fame
 List of Olympic medalists in swimming (women)
 List of World Aquatics Championships medalists in swimming (women)
List of multiple Olympic gold medalists at a single Games
List of multiple Olympic gold medalists

References

External links

1966 births
Living people
Swimmers from Leipzig
People from Bezirk Leipzig
East German female swimmers
German female freestyle swimmers
Olympic swimmers of East Germany
Swimmers at the 1988 Summer Olympics
Olympic gold medalists for East Germany
World record setters in swimming
Medalists at the 1988 Summer Olympics
German female butterfly swimmers
German female medley swimmers
German female backstroke swimmers
World Aquatics Championships medalists in swimming
German sports journalists
German sports broadcasters
European Aquatics Championships medalists in swimming
Olympic gold medalists in swimming
Recipients of the Patriotic Order of Merit in gold
ZDF people
ZDF heute presenters and reporters